James Clayton "Jim" Browne (January 16, 1935 – January 19, 2018) was an American computer scientist.

Early life and education
Born in Conway, Arkansas,  he attended Hendrix College, where he studied chemistry. In 1960, he earned a doctorate in physical chemistry from the University of Texas and joined the faculty. Between 1963 and 1967, Browne worked at Queen's University Belfast in Ireland, where he helped establish the school's first computational center. He was named a full professor upon his return to the University of Texas in 1968. For a time, Browne was chair of the department of computer science, and held the regents' chair #2 in computer sciences.

Career
Browne founded the James C. Browne Graduate Fellowship Fund at the University of Texas, and was named a fellow of the Association for Computing Machinery, the American Physical Society, the American Association for the Advancement of Science, and the British Computer Society.

Brown was married to Gayle, with whom he had three children, from 1959 to his death on January 19, 2018, aged 83.

References
 
 

1935 births
2018 deaths
American computer scientists
University of Texas at Austin College of Natural Sciences alumni
University of Texas at Austin faculty
Academics of Queen's University Belfast
Hendrix College alumni
Fellows of the British Computer Society
Fellows of the Association for Computing Machinery
Fellows of the American Physical Society
Fellows of the American Association for the Advancement of Science
People from Conway, Arkansas